Mei Hubnik (born 10 March 1995) is an Australian female acrobatic gymnast. With partners Amber Kaldor and Madison Chan, Hubnik achieved 15th in the 2014 Acrobatic Gymnastics World Championships.

References

1995 births
Living people
Australian acrobatic gymnasts
Female acrobatic gymnasts